Sandanski Point (Nos Sandanski \'nos san-'dan-ski\) is the point forming the north side of the entrance to Stoyanov Cove on the east coast of Ioannes Paulus II Peninsula, Livingston Island in the South Shetland Islands, Antarctica, projecting 600 m into Hero Bay and formed by an offshoot of Oryahovo Heights.

The point is named after the town of Sandanski in southwestern Bulgaria in connection with Yane Sandanski (1872–1915), a leader of the Bulgarian liberation movement in Macedonia.

Location

Maps
 L.L. Ivanov et al. Antarctica: Livingston Island and Greenwich Island, South Shetland Islands. Scale 1:100000 topographic map. Sofia: Antarctic Place-names Commission of Bulgaria, 2005.
 L.L. Ivanov. Antarctica: Livingston Island and Greenwich, Robert, Snow and Smith Islands. Scale 1:120000 topographic map.  Troyan: Manfred Wörner Foundation, 2009.

Notes

References
 Sandanski Point. SCAR Composite Antarctic Gazetteer
 Bulgarian Antarctic Gazetteer. Antarctic Place-names Commission. (details in Bulgarian, basic data in English)

External links
 Sandanski Point. Copernix satellite image

Headlands of Livingston Island
Sandanski